Lyconus is a genus of merluccid hakes known only from the Atlantic Ocean.

Species
The currently recognized species in this genus are:
 Lyconus brachycolus Holt & Byrne, 1906
 Lyconus pinnatus Günther, 1887

References

Merlucciidae
Ray-finned fish genera
Taxa named by Albert Günther